Arax (Արաքս in Armenian) is an Armenian language literary, social and cultural weekly newspaper published in Tehran, Iran.

Arax also has an online edition in Armenian and Persian.

References

Armenian-language newspapers
Newspapers published in Tehran
Weekly newspapers
Publications with year of establishment missing